The Fate of Sparta is a 1788 tragedy by the British writer Hannah Cowley. It is also known by the longer 
title The Fate of Sparta, or, The Rival Kings.

The original Drury Lane cast included John Philip Kemble as Cleombrotus, Robert Bensley as Leonidas, William Barrymore as Amphares, John Whitfield as Nicrates, Matthew Williames as Mezentius and Sarah Siddons as Cherolice.

References

Bibliography
 Nicoll, Allardyce. A History of English Drama 1660–1900: Volume III. Cambridge University Press, 2009.
 Hogan, C.B (ed.) The London Stage, 1660–1800: Volume V. Southern Illinois University Press, 1968.

1788 plays
Tragedy plays
West End plays
Plays by Hannah Cowley